Family Reunion is an American sitcom created by Meg DeLoatch that was released via streaming on Netflix on July 10, 2019. In September 2019, the series was renewed for a second season which premiered on April 5, 2021. Part 4 was released on August 26, 2021. In October 2021, the series was renewed for a third and final season, Part 5, which premiered on October 27, 2022.

Premise
Family Reunion follows a family of six who move from Seattle, Washington to Columbus, Georgia for the McKellan Family Reunion and decide to stay to be closer to their family.

Cast and characters

Main

Tia Mowry as Cocoa McKellan, a mother of five (as of Season 3) who believes in new-age parenting and sometimes is very sassy but still loves her kids. Her full name is Nicole Joie McKellan. 
Anthony Alabi as Moz McKellan, Cocoa's husband and a former Seahawks tight end. His full name is Moses Deuteronomy McKellan.
Talia Jackson as Jade McKellan, Cocoa and Moz's eldest daughter
Isaiah Russell-Bailey as Shaka McKellan (seasons 1–2); Cocoa and Moz's older son. In season 3 (also known as Part 5) he attends boarding school and does not appear.
Cameron J. Wright as Mazzi McKellan, Cocoa and Moz's younger son.
Jordyn Raya James as Ami McKellan, Cocoa and Moz's youngest daughter. Her full name is Amelia Nicole McKellan
Loretta Devine as M'Dear, Moz's Deep Southern old-fashioned church-going mother. Her full name is Amelia Louise Williams McKellan.

Recurring

Richard Roundtree as Jebidiah McKellan, M'Dear's husband for 43 years and Moz's father who is also a pastor.
Warren Burke as Daniel, Moz's brother
Lexi Underwood as Ava, Jade's friend from church (season 1)
Naomi Grace as Genevieve, Jade's friend from school
Lindsey Da Sylveira as Mikayla, Jade's nemesis
Telma Hopkins as Maybelle, M'Dear's sister
Lance Alexander as Elvis, a family friend of the McKellan family who also has a crush on Jade
Journey Carter as Renee, one of Jade's friends
Jasun Jabbar Wardlaw, Jr. as Tyson, Moz and Cocoa's nephew and Maureen's son (season 3)
Legend and Legacy Jordan as Skye McKellan, Cocoa and Moz's lastborn son, Jade, Shaka, Mazzi and Ami's youngest sibling, Daniel and Grace's nephew and M'Dear and Grandpa's fifth grandchild

Guest stars
Erica Ash as Grace, Moz and Daniel's sister
Charlie Wilson as Himself
Tyler Cole as Royale (season 2)
Mark Curry as Principal Glass (seasons 1–2), the principal of Maya Angelou Magnet School
Amanda Detmer as Haven Sheeks
Jaleel White as Eric
Tempestt Bledsoe as Katrina
Noah Alexander Gerry as Drew, Jade's crush (season 1)
DeLon Shaw as Missy, Jade's friend at school
Jackée Harry as Aunt Dot, M'Dear and Maybelle's sister (seasons 1, 3)
Peri Gilpin as Daphne, Cocoa's mother (season 2)
 Rome Flynn as Tony Olsen (seasons 1, 3)
Kenya Moore as Herself (season 2)
Candiace Dillard Bassett as Sunita Chanel (season 2)
Brandi Glanville as Heidi (season 2)
Akira Akbar as Brooke, Shaka's friend at school (season 2)
Bruce Bruce as Brother Davis (season 2)
Willie Gault as Himself (season 2)
Anika Noni Rose as Miss Karen (season 2)
Tahj Mowry as Mr. Dean (season 2)
Bella Podaras as Kelly-Ann (season 2)
Monique Coleman as Ebony (season 2)
Jadah Marie as Morgan, Shaka's girlfriend (season 2)
Ariel Martin as Jinji Starr (season 2)
Essence Atkins as Maureen, Cocoa's paternal half-sister (season 3)
Lela Rochon as Dr. Turner (season 3)
Rachel True as Cheryl, Cocoa's cousin (season 3)
Wendy Raquel Robinson as Joyce, Tony’s mother and Maybelle's mother-in-law (season 3)
Robert Ri'chard as Vic (season 3)

Episodes

Series overview
<onlyinclude>

Season 1 (2019–20)

Season 2 (2021)

Season 3 (2022)

Production

Development
On October 17, 2018, it was announced that Netflix had given the production a straight-to-series order for a first season consisting of twenty episodes. The series was created by Meg DeLoatch who was also expected to executive produce. Production began in Los Angeles. The first part was released on July 10, 2019. On September 17, 2019, Netflix renewed the series for a second season consisting of sixteen episodes. It was also announced that there will be a holiday special that was released on December 9, 2019 and the nine extra season 1 episodes were released on January 20, 2020. The second season premiered on April 5, 2021. Part 4 was released on August 26, 2021. On October 18, 2021, Netflix renewed the series for a 10-episode third and final season. The third season premiered on October 27, 2022.

Casting
Alongside the initial series announcement, it was reported that Tia Mowry, Loretta Devine, Anthony Alabi, Talia Jackson, Isaiah Russell-Bailey, Cameron J. Wright, and Jordyn James had been cast in series regular roles.

Reception
The review aggregation website Rotten Tomatoes reported a 67% approval rating for the series, based on 6 reviews, with an average rating of 5/10. On March 24, 2021, the series won a NAACP Image Award for Outstanding Comedy Series at the 52nd NAACP Image Awards.

References

External links

2010s American black sitcoms
2020s American black sitcoms
2019 American television series debuts
2022 American television series endings
English-language Netflix original programming
Television shows set in Georgia (U.S. state)
Television series about families
Split television seasons